William Roscoe Wilson Curl was a Virginia lawyer and judge.  Born in Tidewater, Virginia, Curl studied law and then practiced in the county courts.  He was made a judge of the Court of Admiralty in 1777 and thus automatically became a justice of the first Virginia Court of Appeals (now the Supreme Court of Virginia).  He died a short time later, by February 1782.

References

Justices of the Supreme Court of Virginia
Virginia lawyers
1782 deaths